Koloe may refer to:
Koloe, earlier name of Qohaito, an ancient city in Eritrea
Koloe (Lydia), a town of ancient Lydia